The Ministry of Cultures, Arts and Heritage (Mincap) is the Ministry of the State of Chile in charge of the design, formulation and implementation of cultural policies, plans and programs. Its main headquarters are in Valparaíso, in a building located in Plaza Sotomayor, being the only secretariat of the Chilean State whose national address isn't located in Santiago. The current head of the ministry is Julieta Brodsky.

It was created by Law 21045, promulgated on 13 October 2017 and published in the Official Gazette on 3 November of the same year. The Ministry began its functions on 1 March 2018, being the legal successor – through its two undersecretaries: the Undersecretariat of Cultures and the Arts and the Undersecretariat of Cultural Heritage —  of the National Council of Culture and the Arts, an institution created in 2003 and dependent on the Ministry of Education (Mineduc).

List of ministers 

IND: Independent
CS: Social Convergence

References

External links 
  

Cultures
Chile
Chile, Cultures
2018 establishments in Chile